The 2014 FC Dallas season was the club's nineteenth season in existence in Major League Soccer, the top tier of American soccer.

Background

Transfers

In

Out

Loan in

Loan out

Roster 
As of September 18, 2014.

Competitions

Match results

Preseason

Mid-season friendlies

Major League Soccer

League table

Overall standings

Western Conference standings
Western Conference

Results summary

Results by round

Regular season
Kickoff times are in CDT (UTC-05) unless shown otherwise

MLS Cup Playoffs

Western Conference Wild Card Game

Western Conference semifinals

FC Dallas eliminated on away goals

Reserve League
Kickoff times are in CDT (UTC-05) unless shown otherwise

U.S. Open Cup

Statistics

Appearances 

Numbers outside parentheses denote appearances as starter.
Numbers in parentheses denote appearances as substitute.
Players with no appearances are not included in the list.

Goals and assists

Disciplinary record

See also 
 FC Dallas
 2014 in American soccer
 2014 Major League Soccer season

References 

FC Dallas seasons
FC Dallas
FC Dallas
2014 in sports in Texas